Pyrethrum was a genus of several Old World plants now classified as Chrysanthemum or Tanacetum which are cultivated as ornamentals for their showy flower heads. Pyrethrum continues to be used as a common name for plants formerly included in the genus Pyrethrum. Pyrethrum is also the name of a natural insecticide made from the dried flower heads of Chrysanthemum cinerariifolium and Chrysanthemum coccineum. The insecticidal compounds present in these species are pyrethrins.

Description
Some members of the genus Chrysanthemum, such as the following two, are placed in the genus Tanacetum instead by some botanists. Both genera are members of the daisy (or aster) family, Asteraceae. They are all perennial plants with a daisy-like appearance and white petals.

 Tanacetum cinerariifolium is called the Dalmatian chrysanthemum, denoting its origin in that region of the Balkans (Dalmatia). It looks more like the common daisy than other pyrethrums do. Its flowers, typically white with yellow centers, grow from numerous fairly rigid stems. The plant is economically important as a natural source of pyrethrin insecticides. 
C. coccineum, the Persian chrysanthemum, is a perennial plant native to Caucasus and looks somewhat like a daisy. It produces large white, pink or red flowers. The flowering period is June to July in temperate climates (Northern Hemisphere). C. coccineum also contains insecticidal pyrethrins, but it is a poor source compared to C. cinerariifolium.
Other species, such as C. balsamita and C. marshalli, also contain insecticidal substances, but are less effective than the two species mentioned above.

Insecticides
The flowers are pulverized and the active components, called pyrethrins, contained in the seed cases, are extracted and sold in the form of an oleoresin. This is applied as a suspension in water or oil, or as a powder. Pyrethrins attack the nervous systems of all insects, and inhibit female mosquitoes from biting. When present in amounts less than those fatal to insects, they still appear to have an insect repellent effect. They are harmful to fish, but are far less toxic to mammals and birds than many synthetic insecticides and are not persistent, being biodegradable and also decompose easily on exposure to light. They are considered to be amongst the safest insecticides for use around food. Kenya produced 90% (over 6,000 tonnes) of the world's pyrethrum in 1998, called py for short. Production in Tanzania and Ecuador is also significant.  Currently the world's major producer is Tasmania, Australia.

Sprays
Pyrethrum has been used for centuries as an insecticide, and as a lice remedy in the Middle East (Persian powder, also known as "Persian pellitory"). It was sold worldwide under the brand Zacherlin by Austrian industrialist J. Zacherl.  It is one of the most commonly used non-synthetic insecticides allowed in certified organic agriculture.

The flowers should be dried and then crushed and mixed with water.

Pyrethroids are synthetic insecticides based on natural pyrethrum (pyrethrins); one common example is permethrin. A common formulation of pyrethrin is in preparations containing the synthetic chemical piperonyl butoxide: this has the effect of enhancing the toxicity to insects and speeding the effects when compared with pyrethrins used alone. These formulations are known as synergized pyrethrins.

Companion planting
Because pyrethrum contains pyrethrins, they are used as companion plants to repel pest insects from nearby crops and ornamental plants. They are thought to repel aphids, bed bugs (Cimex lectularius), leafhoppers, spider mites, harlequin cabbage bugs, ticks, pickleworms, and imported cabbage worms, among others, in gardens and farms. For example, they are planted among broccoli plants for protection from several common insect pests. The alarm pheromone both attracts ladybug beetles and repels aphids. Ironically, the plants themselves can be some of the first to display signs of aphid, scale or mealybug infestations in the home garden; in the case of companion planting, if the plants attract pests rather than repel them, they become a “distraction” planting, with pests avoiding the more valued plants in favor of the chrysanthemums. As long as pests are kept under control, the chrysanthemums don’t show immediate stress or damage from insect pressures. The regular pruning and deadheading of aphid-covered “distraction” plants makes disposal and control of garden pests far easier.

Toxicity

Mammals 
Rat and rabbit  levels for pyrethrum are high, with doses in some cases of about 1% of the animal's body weight required to cause significant mortality. This is similar to fatal levels in synthetic pyrethroids. Nevertheless, pyrethrum should be handled with the same caution as synthetic insecticides: safety equipment should be worn, and mixing with other chemicals should be avoided.

People can be exposed to pyrethrum as a mixture of cinerin, jasmolin, and pyrethrin in the workplace by breathing it in, getting it in the eyes or on the skin, or swallowing it. The Occupational Safety and Health Administration (OSHA) has set the legal limit (Permissible exposure limit) for pyrethrum exposure in the workplace as 5 mg/m3 over an 8-hour workday. The National Institute for Occupational Safety and Health (NIOSH) has set a Recommended exposure limit (REL) of 5 mg/m3 over an 8-hour workday. At levels of 5000 mg/m3, pyrethrum is immediately dangerous to life and health. People exposed to pyrethrum may experience symptoms including pruritus (itching), dermatitis, papules, erythema (red skin), rhinorrhea (runny nose), sneezing, and asthma.

Other animals 
Pyrethrum, specifically the pyrethrin within, is highly toxic to insects including useful pollinators like bees. The risk is partially reduced as the compound has a rapid breakdown and has a slight insect-repellant activity.

Common names
Common names for Chrysanthemum cinerariifolium include:
Pyrethrum
Pyrethrum daisy
Dalmatian pyrethrum
Dalmatian chrysanthemum
Dalmatian insect flower
Dalmatian pellitory
Big daisy

Common names for Chrysanthemum coccineum include:
Pyrethrum
Pyrethrum daisy
Painted daisy
Persian chrysanthemum
Persian insect flower
Persian pellitory
Caucasian insect powder plant

See also
 Chrysanthemum
 List of companion plants
 Category: Plant toxin insecticides
 Permethrin
 Pyrethrin

References

External links
National Pesticide Information Center: Pyrethrins and Pyrethroids Fact Sheet
CDC - NIOSH Pocket Guide to Chemical Hazards
 EXTOXNET: Pyrethrins and Pyrethroids
 "What is Pyrethrum?"
Role of aphid alarm pheromone produced by the flowers in repelling aphids and attracting ladybug beetles

p
Pyrethroids
Flora of Europe
Plant toxin insecticides
Biological pest control
Garden plants of Europe
Household chemicals
Anthemideae
Plant common names
Historically recognized angiosperm genera